Stylinodon is an extinct genus of taeniodont mammal, and is the best known, and last genus of taeniodonts, lived some 45 million years ago during middle Eocene in North America.

The skull suggests it had a blunt face, and a very short snout. Its canines had developed into huge, incisor-like root-less teeth. Stylinodon's molars were covered in enamel and continued growing throughout its life. Most likely, it fed on rough roots and tubers.

References

External links
 Photograph of skull at Utah Field House of Natural History Museum, at Vernal, Utah

Cimolestans
Eocene mammals of North America
Fossil taxa described in 1874
Prehistoric mammal genera